These are the late night schedules for the four United States broadcast networks that offer programming during this time period, from September 1994 to August 1995. All times are Eastern or Pacific. Affiliates will fill non-network schedule with local, syndicated, or paid programming. Affiliates also have the option to preempt or delay network programming at their discretion.

Legend

Schedule

Saturday

By network

ABC

Returning series
ABC in Concert
ABC World News Now
ABC World News This Morning
Nightline

Not returning from 1993-94:
ABC in Concert Country

CBS

Returning series
CBS Morning News
Crimetime After Primetime
Kids in the Hall
Late Show with David Letterman
Up to the Minute

New series
The Late Late Show with Tom Snyder

Fox

Returning series
Tales from the Crypt 

Not returning from 1993-94:
Comic Strip Live
The Chevy Chase Show 
Code 3 
In Living Color

NBC

Returning series
Friday Night
Late Night with Conan O'Brien
Later with Greg Kinnear
NBC News at Sunrise
NBC Nightside
Saturday Night Live
The Tonight Show with Jay Leno

United States late night network television schedules
1994 in American television
1995 in American television